Canelas is one of the 39 municipalities of Durango, in north-western Mexico. The municipal seat lies at Canelas. The municipality covers an area of 683.4 km².

, the municipality had a total population of 4,683.
It is located in the Sierra Madre Occidental.

Settlements
Canelas has some 70 small villages and ranches. Some of these locations have sawmills and produce wood. This region of Durango has a variety of minerals. These two natural resources provide many people with jobs in Canelas.

References

Municipalities of Durango